Tânia Mara Fassoni-Giansante (born 11 May 1956) is a Brazilian sports shooter. She competed at the 1988 Summer Olympics and the 1992 Summer Olympics.

References

External links
 

1956 births
Living people
Brazilian female sport shooters
Olympic shooters of Brazil
Shooters at the 1988 Summer Olympics
Shooters at the 1992 Summer Olympics
Place of birth missing (living people)
Pan American Games medalists in shooting
Pan American Games bronze medalists for Brazil
Medalists at the 1991 Pan American Games
Shooters at the 1991 Pan American Games
20th-century Brazilian women
21st-century Brazilian women